Lake Forest is a railroad station in Lake Forest, Illinois, served by Metra's Union Pacific North Line. In Metra's zone-based fare system, Lake Forest is in zone F. As of 2018, Lake Forest is the 70th busiest of Metra's 236 non-downtown stations, with an average of 747 weekday boardings. Lake Forest station is located in downtown Lake Forest and is in close proximity to the Lake Forest Library. The station has a ticket office which is open during the morning rush hour, Monday through Friday.

As of April 25, 2022, Lake Forest is served by 23 trains in each direction on weekdays, by all 13 trains in each direction on Saturdays, and by all nine trains in each direction on Sundays.

This station is sometimes referred to as East Lake Forest, to avoid confusion with the  station on the Milwaukee District North Line.

Parking is available along the east side of the tracks along McKinley Road between Woodland Road and north of Illinois Road, along the east side of the tracks along Western Avenue between Illinois Road and Vine Avenue, and at numerous lots near the station. As with many suburban Metra stations, Pace buses serve commuters at the station. No connection between this station and the Lake Forest station on the Milwaukee District North Line is available, however.

The current building was built in 1900 by the Chicago and North Western Railway to a design by architects Frost & Granger.

References

External links
Metra (UP-N) - Lake Forest Station
Station from Deerpath Road from Google Maps Street View

Metra stations in Illinois
Former Chicago and North Western Railway stations
Lake Forest, Illinois
Railway stations in Lake County, Illinois
Railway stations in the United States opened in 1900
1900 establishments in Illinois
Union Pacific North Line